Pagedangan is a district located in the Tangerang Regency of Banten Province in Java, Indonesia. It covers an area of 45.69 km2 and had a population of 95,194 at the 2010 Census and 107,897 at the 2020 Census.

References

Tangerang Regency
Districts of Banten
Populated places in Banten